King Saud Air Base (Arabic: قاعدة الملك سعود الجوية) (IATA: KMC  ICAO: OEKK) is a military air base located in Hafr Al-Batin, Saudi Arabia.

The Air Base is located approximately 60 km north of King Khalid Military City.

Overview

Royal Saudi Air Force Wing 4 is located at this air base.

-No.7 Squadron
(Panavia Tornado IDS)

-No.42 Squadron
(Boeing F-15 C & D)

-No.92 Squadron 
(Boeing F-15 SA)

References 

Military airbases established in the 1960s
1963 establishments in Saudi Arabia